Igbo-Ukwu (English: Great Igbo) is a town in the Nigerian state of Anambra in the south-central part of the country. The town comprises three quarters namely Obiuno, Ngo, and Ihite (an agglomeration of 4 quarters) with several villages within each quarter and thirty-six (36) administrative wards.It is also bordered by Ora-eri, Ichida, Azigbo, Ezinifite, Amichi, Isuofia, Ikenga and some other towns.

Archaeological significance

Igbo-Ukwu is notable for three archaeological sites, where excavations have found bronze artifacts from a highly sophisticated bronze metal-working culture dating to 9th century AD, centuries before other known bronzes of the region.

The first, called Igbo Isaiah, was uncovered in 1938 by Isaiah Anozie, a local villager, who found the bronze works while digging beside his home. Five bronze artifacts from the original excavation are now in the British Museum's collection. They include a small staff, a head of a ram, a large manilla, an intricately designed crescent-shaped vessel and a small pendant in the shape of a local chief's head with scarification (ichi) marks on the face.

Formal excavations by the archaeologist Thurstan Shaw in 1959 at the request of the Nigerian government, resulted in the discovery of two other sites, Igbo Richard and Igbo Jonah, containing the remains of an ancient culture. Later, these were excavated as well. Artifacts have included jewelry, ceramics, a corpse adorned in what appears to be regalia, and many assorted bronze, copper, and iron objects. Some of these contain materials that are evidence of a long-distance trading system extending to Egypt.

Radiocarbon dating placed the sites to 850 AD, which would make the Igbo-Ukwu culture the earliest-known example of bronze casting in the region. The craftsmen were working centuries before those who made the more well-known Ife bronzes. The archaeological sites in southeastern Nigeria are associated with the Nri-Igbo. The three sites include Igbo Isaiah (a shrine), Igbo Richard (a burial chamber), and Igbo Jonah (a cache). Artifacts found in these sites have shown that by the 9th century AD, the Igbo-Ukwu people had established a complex religious system and an economy based on agriculture and trade with other African peoples as far as the Nile valley.

History

Artifact of Igbo ukwu

Alice Apley writes about the work:
"The inhabitants of Igbo-Ukwu had a metalworking art that flourished as early as the ninth century. Three sites have been excavated, revealing hundreds of ritual vessels and regalia castings of bronze or leaded bronze that are among the most inventive and technically accomplished bronzes ever made.

The people of Igbo-Ukwu (originally known as Igbo-Nkwo), ancestors of present-day Igbo, were the earliest smithers of copper and its alloys in West Africa, working the metal through hammering, bending, twisting, and incising. They are likely among the earliest groups of West Africans to employ the lost-wax casting techniques in the production of bronze sculptures. Oddly, evidence suggests that their metalworking repertory was limited and Igbo smiths were not familiar with techniques such as raising, solderingartifact of igbo ukwuriveting, and wired making, though these techniques were used elsewhere on the continent."

See also
Kingdom of Nri

References

External links

Nri-Igbo
Towns in Anambra State
Archaeological sites of Western Africa